, , is a Japanese manga artist. He is best known for his long-running series JoJo's Bizarre Adventure, which began publication in Weekly Shōnen Jump in 1987 and has over 120 million copies in circulation, making it one of the best-selling manga series in history.

Biography

Early life
Araki grew up in Sendai, Japan with his parents and younger identical twin sisters. He cites his sisters' annoyances as the reason he spent time alone in his room reading manga, naming Ai to Makoto as the most important one to him. He supposes that his father's art books were his motive for drawing manga; he was particularly influenced by the work of French artist Paul Gauguin. After a school friend praised his manga, he began secretly drawing manga behind his parents' backs. He submitted his first work to a magazine in his first year of high school. All his submissions were rejected while other artists his age or younger were making successful debuts. He decided to go to the publishers' offices in Tokyo to find out why in person, taking a manga, Poker Under Arms, that he stayed up all-night to finish. The Shueisha editor he met highly criticized the work, but said it had potential and to clean it up for the upcoming Tezuka Awards.

Debut and JoJo's Bizarre Adventure
Araki left Miyagi University of Education before graduating, and made his debut under the name  in 1980 with the wild west one-shot Poker Under Arms, which was a "Selected Work" at that year's Tezuka Award. His first serialization was Cool Shock B.T. in 1983, about a young magician who solves mysteries. But the first series to display his signature amount of gore was 1984's Baoh. It tells the story of a man who is implanted with a parasite by an evil organization, giving him superhuman powers, and follows as he fights against them. It was adapted into an OVA in 1989, the manga was released in the US by Viz Media in 1990 (in tankōbon form in 1995), but the OVA didn't get a stateside release until 2002. It wasn't until The Gorgeous Irene in 1985, that he really developed his signature art style of buff, muscular characters (it would later become more flamboyant).

His next series would become his magnum opus, 1987's JoJo's Bizarre Adventure. The series begins in 1880s England and follows Jonathan Joestar (JoJo) and his adopted brother Dio Brando, who eventually tries to kill their father in order to obtain his share of inheritance. When confronted, Dio puts on an ancient mask that turns him into a vampire. JoJo then learns a breathing technique called hamon which grants JoJo various powers to combat Dio. He then travels to Dio's castle to kill him. Subsequent arcs of JoJo follow the descendants of the Joestar family, and many are set in different parts of the world. Part 3, which would become the most popular part in the series, downplays the vampire story and hamon technique and instead introduces the power of Stands, which continues in the series today. Still being serialized over 30 years later, JoJo's Bizarre Adventure has been adapted into numerous other forms of media and the manga had 120 million collected volumes in print by 2022. From 2011 to 2021, Araki produced JoJolion, the eighth story arc of the series, serialized in Ultra Jump magazine.

Recent work

The September 2007 issue of Cell had a cover drawn by Araki with a ligase represented as one of his Stands. In 2008, Araki drew the cover art for a collection featuring Yasunari Kawabata's short story "The Dancing Girl of Izu". He drew the cover for the limited edition of Base Ball Bear's "Breeeeze Girl" single, which actually takes an image from the JoJo manga.

Also in 2009, Hirohiko Araki was one of five artists selected by the Musée du Louvre to create original works set at the famous museum. His piece Rohan at the Louvre starred JoJo's Rohan Kishibe and was shown at the exhibit titled Le Louvre invite la bande dessinée ("The Louvre Invites Comic-Strip Art"), which was created to show the diversity of comics, from January 19 to April 13.
Rohan at the Louvre was highly praised. The following year, Rohan at the Louvre was published in France and ran in Japan's Ultra Jump. It was released in the US by NBM Publishing in February 2012.

From September 17 to October 6, 2011, the Gucci store in Shinjuku hosted the Gucci x Hirohiko Araki x Spur "Rohan Kishibe Goes to Gucci" Exhibition, a collaboration between the luxury Italian clothing brand, JoJo's creator and the fashion magazine Spur. The exhibit celebrated the 90th anniversary of Gucci and featured a life-size figure of Rohan Kishibe, as well as numerous illustrations by Araki; including actual pieces of the brand's own 2011-2012 fall/winter collection and his own original fashion designs. For Spur, Araki drew Kishibe Rohan meets Gucci., a full-color one-shot featuring Rohan Kishibe that ran in its October 2011 issue. Spur once again ran a JoJo spinoff by Araki, Jolyne, Fly High with Gucci starring Jolyne Cujoh from Part 6, in their February 2013 issue. A free English translation is available on Gucci's Facebook page.

To raise awareness of the ongoing reconstruction efforts of the Hiraizumi ruins, that were damaged by the March 2011 Tōhoku earthquake and tsunami and declared a UNESCO World Heritage Site in June, Araki drew artwork depicting the ruins. A "Hirohiko Araki JoJo Exhibition" opened in Araki's native Sendai at the end of July 2012 to celebrate the 25th anniversary of JoJo's Bizarre Adventure, it then moved to Tokyo in October.

He drew the album cover for Sayuri Ishikawa's 2012 album X -Cross-, where she performs one of the series' iconic poses and is drawn wearing jewelry from the manga, the cover of the 2012 reprint of Tamaki Saitō's Lacan for Surviving, and the cover of the 2015 compilation album for composer Akira Senju.

A book explaining Araki's methodology on creating manga, titled , was released on April 17, 2015, in Japan; an English translation was later released on June 6, 2017. A stage adaptation of Araki's 1994 one-shot Under Execution, Under Jailbreak ran from November 20 to 29, 2015, at the Galaxy Theatre, then touring the country in December. The play also included elements of his 1996 one-shot Dolce, and His Master.

Araki created an official poster for the 2020 Tokyo Paralympics, titled The Sky above The Great Wave off the Coast of Kanagawa. The piece is heavily inspired by Hokusai's famous woodblock print, The Great Wave off Kanagawa.

Works

Manga
 
 
 
 
 
 
 
 
 
 
 
 
  (Spin-off of JoJo's Bizarre Adventure)
  (Spin-off of JoJo's Bizarre Adventure)
  (Spin-off of JoJo's Bizarre Adventure)
  (Spin-off of JoJo's Bizarre Adventure)
  (Spin-off of JoJo's Bizarre Adventure)
  (Spin-off of JoJo's Bizarre Adventure)

Other
 Famicom Jump II: Saikyō no Shichinin (February 1991, seventh boss monster design)
 Kamedas (1993, an alternate story of Kochira Katsushika-ku Kameari Kōen-mae Hashutsujo, an illustration)
 JoJo's Bizarre Adventure (November 4, 1993, novel written by Mayori Sekijima and Hiroshi Yamaguchi, illustrated by Araki)
 JoJo 6251 (December 10, 1993, art and guidebook)
 JoJo A-Go!Go! (February 25, 2000, artbook)
 Music is the Key of Life (December 13, 2000, album by Sugiurumn, cover)
 GioGio's Bizarre Adventure II: Golden Heart/Golden Ring (May 28, 2001, novel written by Gichi Ōtsuka and Tarō Miyashō, supervised and illustrated by Araki)
 Life Ground Music (February 27, 2002, album by Sugiurumn, cover)
 Spy! Boy Alex series of Her Majesty the Queen (2002, cover)
 Kochira Katsushika-ku Kameari Kōen-mae Hashutsujo (2006, 30th anniversary special illustration)
 "Catwalk" (April 26, 2006, single by Soul'd Out, cover)
 Uniqlo (2006, T-shirt design)
 Fist of the North Star (2006, special tribute illustration in Weekly Comic Bunch)
 Cell (September 7, 2007, front cover)
 The Book: JoJo's Bizarre Adventure 4th Another Day (November 26, 2007, novel written by Otsuichi, supervised and illustrated by Arashi)
 "The Dancing Girl of Izu" (2008, cover)
 "Breeeeze Girl" (June 24, 2009, a single by Base Ball Bear, cover of the limited edition)
 Naruto (2009, tenth anniversary special illustration)
 Shameless Purple Haze: Purple Haze Feedback (September 16, 2011, novel written by Kouhei Kadono, illustrated by Araki)
 JoJo's Bizarre Adventure Over Heaven (December 16, 2011, novel written by Nisio Isin, cover)
 JoJo's Bizarre Adventure: Part 3' (February 5, 2019, cover)
 Ikinobiru tame no Lacan (Lacan for Survival) (2012, Tamaki Saitō book about Jacques Lacan, cover of the paperback edition)
 Jorge Joestar (September 19, 2012, novel written by Ōtarō Maijō, illustrated by Araki)
 X -Cross- (September 19, 2012, an album by Sayuri Ishikawa, cover)
 Hirohiko Araki Works 1981-2012 (2012, artbook)
 JoJomenon (October 5, 2012, artbook)
 JoJoveller (September 19, 2013, artbook set)
 JoJonium (December 4, 2013 - March 4, 2015, covers of the large format rerelease of JoJo's Bizarre Adventure)
 Loopified [Japanese Complete Edition] (October 8, 2014, album by Dirty Loops, cover)
 Main Themes (February 25, 2015, an album by Akira Senju, cover)
 
 Stormbreaker (novel, illustrations for Fantasy Press)
Learning Japanese History Through Manga, Volume 2 (October 28, 2016, cover)
Learning Japanese History Through Manga, Volume 18 (October 28, 2016, cover)
UOMO (August 24, 2018, cover)
The Sky above The Great Wave off the Coast of Kanagawa (2020 Tokyo Paralympics poster)

References

External links
 

JoJo's Bizarre Adventure
Manga artists from Miyagi Prefecture
People from Sendai
1960 births
Living people